Mergenthaler Vocational-Technical High School (commonly referred to as "Mervo" or "MerVo-Tech") is a public high school in Baltimore, Maryland, United States. It is one of the two premiere vocational-technical high schools of the city, the other being Carver Vocational-Technical High School, on Presstman Street, on the other side of the city in West Baltimore.

Mervo was opened in 1953, established as a vocational-technical school that is named after Ottmar Mergenthaler (1854-1899), the inventor of the Linotype typesetting machine which revolutionized the printing and newspaper industries.

The school, according to its website, uses its curriculum to "educate students to function in an industrial and challenging technological society." All students must apply and meet certain standards of entrance criteria for acceptance to the school.

In 2008, "Mervo" had been named by the U.S. News & World Report magazine, as a "Bronze Medal" school.
In 2012, The Mervo Mustangs Alumni Association was established.

Mervo also has accelerated curriculum which has both Advanced Placement (AP) courses and Honors Classes in all areas of education.

Mervo has 22 state-approved trades courses for students to enter into, including: Accounting and Finance, Allied Health, Auto Body and Repair, Automotive Technology, Business Management, CADD (Computer Aided Drawing and Design), Carpentry, Childcare, CISCO Networking Academy, Commercial Baking, Computer Science, Cosmetology, Electrical Construction, Food Services, Graphic Arts and Printing, Law and Leadership, Masonry, Plumbing, Project Lead The Way (Pre-Engineering), Teacher Academy and Welding.

Graduating rates
Mervo has a graduation rate of above 82%.

Football field

The football field was named Art Modell Field at Mervo in honor of Art Modell, the longtime owner of the former Cleveland Browns professional football team franchise in the National Football League (NFL), that later relocated in 1995 to become the Baltimore Ravens. The field's renovation was spearheaded by The Ravens All Community Team Foundation, successor Ravens owner Steve Bisciotti, CB Chris McAlister and the NFL Youth Football Fund. The $1 million project includes installation of a Sportexe turf field (like that at M&T Bank Stadium at Camden Yards), additional bleachers on the home/away sides, a ticket booth, and upgrades to the restrooms and concession stand. Serving as the primary home to the Mergenthaler Vo-Tech High School football team "Mustangs", the stadium will also host the nearby Northwood Youth Football league and the Baltimore Nighthawks of the Independent Women's Football League. The new $1 million football stadium will bear the name of deceased former Baltimore Ravens owner Art Modell.

Mervo clubs
Mervo has clubs for their students to be involved in and support groups. There are over 28 clubs after school.

Cheerleading
Choir
Student Government
Badminton
Baseball
Cross Country
Football
Basketball

Girls Basketball
Lacrosse
Soccer
Softball
Swimming
Track & Field
Volleyball
Wrestling
Dance
Drama
Band
 Majorette

Championships

Mervo has won championships against other schools.

Recently entering into the city conversation as a football powerhouse after reeling several city titles and playoffs appearance from 2013 to 2016. However, Mervo is historically a Track & Field and Cross Country powerhouse with a massive amount of MSA A & B Conference Regular Season and Championship Meet titles. When Baltimore City public schools were entered into the MPSSA to compete with county public schools their dominance continued. Mervo Track boasts the only State Titles in school history 95,96 and 98. Led for decades by Coach Fred Hendricks Mervo was always in the conversation for championships and on the national stage, stellar Penn Relay performances.

Mervo Football

Varsity Vo-Tech Bowl:(2010, 2012, 2013, 2014)
JV Baltimore City Championships: (1984,1994,1996,2012)
Mervo Varsity Baltimore City Championship:
(1975, 2014*Undefeated, 2015)

•Mervo Varsity State Championships :

2021 State championship 

Mervo Baseball
States:(1996,1997) *Regionals:(1996,1997) *City:(1996, 1997)

Mervo Wrestling
State:(2009) *Regionals:(2006, 2009, 2012, 2013, 2014) *City:(2006, 2009, 2011, 2012, 2013, 2014)

Mervo Girls Basketball
JV Baltimore City Championships:(2012, 2013) *Varsity City Championships:(2012, 2013)

Mervo Basketball

JV Baltimore City Championship:(2012) *Varsity City Championship:(2012) Regionals:(2012)

Mervo Tennis
City:(2012) *Regionals:(2012) *State:(2012)
Mervo Step Team Diamond Divas: *Undefeated Baltimore City Champions(2007-2008)
Cheerleading Championship(2012)

Mervo Cross Country

 MSA C Conference Championship 1991
 MSA B Conference Championship 1993
 Baltimore City Championship 1993-1997
 Regional Champion 1994 & 1996

Mergenthaler crest
The official Mergenthaler crest is a blue and gold cogwheel for 10th-12th graders, which is representative of the original printing heritage and now vocational and technical industries that Mervo prepares its students for. The official Mergenthaler Vo-Tech uniform shirts for 9th graders is a gold shirt with a blue cogwheel.

School song
The Mergenthaler School song was penned  by the president of the senior class of 1955. The Song is performed by the Mergenthaler Mass Choir before each school assembly.

Following the playing and singing of the national anthem of the United States with the "Star-Spangled Banner" - composed in Baltimore by Francis Scott Key during the British attack on Fort McHenry in the Battle of Baltimore, September 12-13-14th, 1814, during the War of 1812.

Notable alumni

Bossman, rapper
James Carter, Olympic athlete
Marcus Hatten, former NBA player, 2006 top scorer in the Israel Basketball Premier League
Brandon M. Scott, Mayor of Baltimore City
Sisqo, R&B singer
Maurice Tyler, former NFL defensive back

References

External links

1953 establishments in Maryland
Educational institutions established in 1953
Magnet schools in Maryland
Middle States Commission on Secondary Schools
Public high schools in Maryland
Public schools in Baltimore